Davidson House or Davidson Building may refer to:

 Davidson–Smitherman House, Centreville, AL, listed on the NRHP in Alabama
 Davidson Lake Shelter Cabin, Angoon, AK, listed on the NRHP in Alaska
 Sam Davidson House, Evening Shade, AR, listed on the NRHP in Arkansas
 Gifford-Davidson House, Elgin, IL, listed on the NRHP in Illinois
 Breechbill-Davidson House, Garrett, IN, listed on the NRHP in Indiana
 Davidson Building (Sioux City, Iowa), listed on the NRHP in Iowa
 G. W. Davidson House and Bank, Auburn, KY, listed on the NRHP in Kentucky
 A. C. Davidson House, Bowling Green, KY, listed on the NRHP in Kentucky
 Davidson House (Shreveport, Louisiana), listed on the NRHP in Louisiana
 Wilbur F. Davidson House, Port Huron, MI, listed on the NRHP in Michigan
 Davidson Building (Hannibal, Missouri), listed on the NRHP in Missouri
 Davidson Building (Anaconda, Montana), listed on the NRHP in Montana
 Walter V. Davidson House, Buffalo, New York, designed by architect Frank Lloyd Wright
 Clarke-Hobbs-Davidson House, Hendersonville, NC, listed on the NRHP in North Carolina
 Benjamin W. Davidson House, Huntersville, NC, listed on the NRHP in North Carolina
 Davidson House (Troutman, North Carolina), listed on the NRHP in North Carolina
 Sherwood-Davidson and Buckingham Houses, Newark, OH, listed on the NRHP in Ohio
 Davidson–Childs House, Hood River, OR, listed on the NRHP in Oregon
 Dr. John E. and Mary D. Davidson House, Independence, OR, listed on the NRHP in Oregon
 Dr. Green Davidson House, Wharton, TX, listed on the NRHP in Texas
 Davidson House (Steilacoom, Washington), listed on the NRHP in Washington
 Miller-Davidson House, Menomonee Falls, WI, listed on the NRHP in Wisconsin